Happy Mood is the second EP by Dessau, released in 1986 by Faction Records.

Music
The tracks "Europe Light" and "Imperial Hotel" were released on the 1989 compilations Music View - Radio's Alternative Talk Show #59 & #60 by Joseph Fox Communications, Inc. and Nashville Rock (What You Haven't Heard...) by Joseph Fox Communications, Inc. The songs "First Year" was originally released on the band's Red Languages EP.

Track listing

Personnel
Adapted from the Happy Mood liner notes.

Dessau
 John Elliott – instruments, vocals, cover art, illustrations, design

Additional performers
 Frank Brodlo – bass guitar (B1)
 Tom Gregory – percussion and production (A2)
 Kim Ervin Elliott – vocals (B2)
 Tommy Lee Harding – percussion and production (A2)
 James Horn – bass guitar (B2)
 Skot Nelson – guitar (A2, B1)
 Mike Orr – bass guitar (A2)
 Andy Schmidt – guitar (A1)

Production and design
 Tom Der – production (B1, B2), engineering (B1)
 Robb Earls – production and engineering (A1)
 Michel Kestemont – production and engineering (B2)
 Mark Wood – executive-producer

Release history

References

External links 
 

1986 EPs
Dessau (band) albums